Gladiola or Gladiolas may refer to:

Gladiolus, a genus of perennial flowering plants
 Gladiola (film), a 1915 silent drama
 "Gladiola", a 1976 song by Helen Reddy
 "Gladiolas", a song by Ida from the 2001 album The Braille Night
 The Gladiolas, an American band, later Maurice Williams and the Zodiacs
 Gladiola outpost, an Israeli IDF outpost attacked during the 2005 Hezbollah cross-border raid
 , a U.S. Navy patrol vessel 1917–1919
 Via gladiola, a route in the International Four Days Marches Nijmegen, a multiple-day marching event in The Netherlands

See also

 Gladiolus (disambiguation)